Cornelius Rhoades (June 4, 1892 – death unknown) was an American Negro league catcher in the 1910s.

A native of Camden, New Jersey, Rhoades played for the Hilldale Club in 1917. In his eight recorded games, he posted five hits and four walks in 33 plate appearances.

References

External links
 and Seamheads

1892 births
Year of death missing
Place of death missing
Hilldale Club players
Baseball players from Camden, New Jersey
American baseball players